The SIGCOMM Award recognizes lifetime contribution to the field of communication networks.
The award is presented in the annual SIGCOMM Technical Conference.

The awardees have been:

 2022 Deborah Estrin and Henning Schulzrinne
 2021 Hari Balakrishnan
 2020 Amin Vahdat and Lixia Zhang
 2019 Mark Handley
 2018 Jennifer Rexford
 2017 Raj Jain
 2016 Jim Kurose
 2015 Albert Greenberg
 2014 George Varghese
 2013 Larry Peterson
 2012 Nick McKeown
 2011 Vern Paxson
 2010 Radia Perlman
 2009 Jon Crowcroft
 2008 Don Towsley
 2007 Sally Floyd
 2006 Domenico Ferrari
 2005 Paul Mockapetris
 2004 Simon S. Lam
 2003 David Cheriton
 2002 Scott Shenker
 2001 Van Jacobson
 2000 Andre Danthine
 1999 Peter Kirstein
 1998 Larry Roberts
 1997 Jon Postel
 1997 Louis Pouzin
 1996 Vint Cerf
 1995 David J. Farber
 1994 Paul Green
 1993 Robert Kahn
 1992 Sandy Fraser
 1991 Hubert Zimmermann
 1990 David D. Clark
 1990 Leonard Kleinrock
 1989 Paul Baran

See also

 List of computer science awards
 List of pioneers in computer science

References

External links
 SIGCOMM Award Recipients

Computer science awards
Association for Computing Machinery